Lénaëlle Gilleron-Gorry (born 23 April 1995) is a French figure skater. She is the 2011 Merano Cup silver medalist, the 2012 Triglav Trophy bronze medalist, and placed 11th at the 2013 European Championships.

Programs

Competitive highlights 
GP: Grand Prix; JGP: Junior Grand Prix

References

External links 

 

French female single skaters
1995 births
Living people
Figure skaters from Paris